George Balanchine (born Georgiy Melitonovich Balanchivadze; ; January 22, 1904 (O. S. January 9) – April 30, 1983) was an ethnic Georgian-American ballet choreographer who was one of the most influential 20th-century choreographers. Styled as the father of American ballet, he co-founded the New York City Ballet and remained its artistic director for more than 35 years. His choreography is characterized by plotless ballets with minimal costume and décor, performed to classical and neoclassical music.

Born in St. Petersburg, Balanchine took the standards and technique from his time at the Imperial Ballet School and fused it with other schools of movement that he had adopted during his tenure on Broadway and in Hollywood, creating his signature "neoclassical style".

He was a choreographer known for his musicality; he expressed music with dance and worked extensively with leading composers of his time like Igor Stravinsky. Balanchine was invited to America in 1933 by a young arts patron named Lincoln Kirstein, and together they founded the School of American Ballet in 1934 as well as the New York City Ballet in 1948.

Early life

Balanchine was born Georgiy Melitonovich Balanchivadze in Saint Petersburg, Russian Empire, son of Georgian opera singer and composer Meliton Balanchivadze, one of the founders of the Tbilisi Opera and Ballet Theatre and later the culture minister of the short-lived Democratic Republic of Georgia, which became independent in 1918 but was later subsumed into the Soviet Union.

The rest of the Georgian side of Balanchine's family consisted largely of artists and soldiers. Little is known of Balanchine's Russian, maternal side. His mother, Meliton's second wife, Maria Nikolayevna Vasilyeva, is said to be the daughter of Nikolai von Almedingen, a German, who later left Russia and abandoned his family, causing Maria to take her mother's name. She was fond of ballet and viewed it as a form of social advancement from the lower reaches of Saint Petersburg society. She was eleven years younger than Meliton and rumored to have been his former housekeeper, although "she had at least some culture in her background" as she could play piano well. The Balanchine mother also worked at a bank.  Although she loved ballet, she wished for her son to join the military. This was a difficult topic to enforce in the family because not only was the mother artistic, George's father was also very talented at playing the piano. Many believe that because his father was very invested in the arts, Balanchine's career of being a businessman failed. Balanchine had three other siblings. One of them being Andrei Balanchivadze, who became a well-known Georgian composer like his father.

Career

Early auditions and training
As a child, Balanchine was not particularly interested in ballet, but his mother insisted that he audition with his sister Tamara, who shared her mother's interest in the art. Balanchine's brother Andria Balanchivadze instead followed his father's love for music and became a composer in Soviet Georgia. Tamara's career, however, would be cut short by her death in unknown circumstances as she was trying to escape on a train from besieged Leningrad to Georgia.

Based on his audition, during 1913 (at age nine), Balanchine relocated from rural Finland to Saint Petersburg and was accepted into the Imperial Ballet School, principal school of the Imperial Ballet, where he was a student of Pavel Gerdt and Samuil Andrianov (Gerdt's son-in-law).

Balanchine spent the World War I years at the Mariinsky Theater until it closed down in 1917 due to a government decree. Attending ballet here could have been viewed as a convenience to the Balanchivadze family because this is where his father composed music. This theater was transferred to the People's Enlightenment Commissariat and became property of the state. The Theater reopened in 1918, then two years later the theater was called the State Academic Theater of Opera and Ballet. He mounted some new and experimental ballets for the Mikhailovsky Theatre in Petrograd. Among them were Le Boeuf sur le toit (1920) by Jean Cocteau and Darius Milhaud, and a scene for Caesar and Cleopatra by George Bernard Shaw.

After graduating in 1921, Balanchine enrolled in the Petrograd Conservatory while working in the corps de ballet at the State Academic Theater for Opera and Ballet (formerly the State Theater of Opera and Ballet and known as the Mariinsky Ballet). His studies at the conservatory included advanced piano, music theory, counterpoint, harmony, and composition. Balanchine graduated from the conservatory in 1923, and danced as a member of the corps until 1924. While still in his teens, Balanchine choreographed his first work, a pas de deux named La Nuit (1920, music by Anton Rubinstein), a piece which the school of directors did not approve of or like. George Balanchine went about his choreography in an experimental way during the evening time. He and his colleagues eventually performed this piece at the State School of Ballet. This was followed by another duet, Enigma, with the dancers in bare feet rather than ballet shoes. While teaching at the Mariinsky Ballet, he met Tamara Geva, his future wife. In 1923, with Geva and fellow dancers, Balanchine formed a small ensemble, the Young Ballet.

Ballets Russes

In 1924, the Young Ballet managed to obtain a permission to leave Russia and tour around Europe. Balanchine with his wife, Tamara Geva, and several other dancers (Alexandra Danilova, Nicholas Efimov) went to Germany, but all performances in Berlin were met coldly. The Young Ballet had to perform in small cities of the Rhine Province such as Wiesbaden, Bad Ems, and Moselle. Geva wrote later, that in that time they had to dance ‘in small dark places, in summer theaters and private ballrooms, in beer gardens and before mental patients‘. They could barely afford paying for hotels and often had only tea for meal. In London, they had two weeks of very unsuccessful performances, when the audience met them with dead silence. With expiring visas, they were not welcome in any other European country. They moved to Paris, where there was a large Russian community. At this time, the impresario Sergei Diaghilev invited Balanchine to join the Ballets Russes as a choreographer.

Balanchine was 21 at the time and became the main choreographer for the most famous ballet company. Sergei Diaghilev insisted that Balanchine change his name from Balanchivadze to Balanchine. Diaghilev soon promoted Balanchine to ballet master of the company and encouraged his choreography. Between 1924 and Diaghilev's death in 1929, Balanchine created ten ballets, as well as lesser works. During these years, he worked with composers such as Sergei Prokofiev, Igor Stravinsky, Erik Satie, and Maurice Ravel, and artists who designed sets and costumes, such as Pablo Picasso, Georges Rouault, and Henri Matisse, creating new works that combined all the arts.

Among his new works, during 1928 in Paris, Balanchine premiered Apollon musagète (Apollo and the muses) in a collaboration with Stravinsky; it was one of his most innovative ballets, combining classical ballet and classical Greek myth and images with jazz movement. He described it as "the turning point in my life".  Apollo is regarded as the original neoclassical ballet. Apollo brought the male dancer to the forefront, giving him two solos within the ballet. Apollo is known for its minimalism, using simple costumes and sets.  This allowed the audience not to be distracted from the movement. Balanchine considered music to be the primary influence on choreography, as opposed to the narrative.

Suffering a serious knee injury, Balanchine had to limit his dancing, effectively ending his performance career.

After Diaghilev's death, the Ballets Russes went bankrupt. To earn money, Balanchine began to stage dances for Charles B. Cochran's revues and Sir Oswald Stoll's variety shows in London. He was retained by the Royal Danish Ballet in Copenhagen as a guest ballet master. Among his new works for the company were Danses Concertantes, a pure dance piece to music by Stravinsky, and Night Shadow, revived under the title La Sonnambula.

In 1931, with the help of financier Serge Denham, René Blum and Colonel Wassily de Basil formed the Ballets Russes de Monte-Carlo, a successor to Ballets Russes. The new company hired Leonide Massine and Balanchine as choreographers. Featured dancers included David Lichine and Tatiana Riabouchinska.  In 1933, without consulting Blum, Col. de Basil dropped Balanchine after one year – ostensibly because he thought that audiences preferred the works choreographed by Massine. Librettist Boris Kochno was also let go, while dancer Tamara Toumanova (a strong admirer of Balanchine) left the company when Balanchine was fired.

Balanchine and Kochno immediately founded Les Ballets 1933, with Kochno, Diaghilev's former secretary and companion, serving as artistic advisor.  The company was financed by Edward James, a British poet and ballet patron. The company lasted only a couple of months during 1933, performing only in Paris and London, when the Great Depression made arts more difficult to fund. Balanchine created several new works, including collaborations with composers Kurt Weill, Darius Milhaud, Henri Sauguet and designer Pavel Tchelitchew.

United States

Balanchine insisted that his first project in the United States would be to establish a ballet school because he wanted to develop dancers who had strong technique along with his particular style. Compared to his classical training, he thought they could not dance well.  With the assistance of Lincoln Kirstein and Edward M.M. Warburg, the School of American Ballet opened to students on January 2, 1934, less than three months after Balanchine arrived in the U.S. Later that year, Balanchine had his students perform in a recital, where they premiered his new work Serenade to music by Tchaikovsky at Woodlands, the Warburg summer estate. The school of American Ballet became and is now a home for dancers of New York City Ballet as well as companies from all over the world.

Between his ballet activities in the 1930s and 1940s, Balanchine choreographed Broadway musicals written by such notables as Richard Rodgers, Lorenz Hart and Vernon Duke. Among them, Balanchine choreographed Rodgers and Hart's On Your Toes in 1936, where his program billing specified "Choreography by George Balanchine" as opposed to the usual billing of "Dances staged by". This marked the first time in Broadway history that a dance-maker received choreography billing for a Broadway musical.  On Your Toes featured two ballets: La Princesse Zenobia and Slaughter on Tenth Avenue, in which a tap dancer falls in love with a dance-hall girl. Balanchine's choreography in musicals was unique at the time because it furthered the plot of the story.

Relocation to West Coast

Balanchine relocated his company to Hollywood in 1938, where he rented a white two-story house with "Kolya", Nicholas Kopeikine, his "rehearsal pianist and lifelong colleague", on North Fairfax Avenue not far from Hollywood Boulevard. Balanchine created dances for five movies, all of which featured Vera Zorina, whom he met on the set of The Goldwyn Follies and who subsequently became his second wife. He reconvened the company as the American Ballet Caravan and toured with it throughout North and South America, but it folded after several years. From 1944 to 1946, during and after World War II, Balanchine served as resident choreographer for Blum & Massine's new iteration of Ballet Russe de Monte-Carlo.

Return to New York
Soon Balanchine formed a new dance company, Ballet Society, again with the generous help of Lincoln Kirstein. He continued to work with contemporary composers such as Paul Hindemith, from whom he commissioned a score in 1940 for The Four Temperaments. First performed on November 20, 1946, this modernist work was one of his early abstract and spare ballets, angular and very different in movement. After several successful performances, the most notable featuring the ballet Orpheus created in collaboration with Stravinsky and sculptor and designer Isamu Noguchi, the City of New York offered the company residency at the New York City Center.

In 1954, Balanchine created his version of The Nutcracker, in which he played the mime role of Drosselmeyer.  The company has since performed the ballet every year in New York City during the Christmas season. His other famous ballets created for New York companies include Firebird, Allegro Brilliante, Agon, The Seven Deadly Sins, and Episodes.

In 1967, Balanchine's ballet Jewels displayed specific characteristics of Balanchine's choreography.  The corps de ballet dancers execute rapid footwork and precise movements.  The choreography is difficult to execute and all dancers must do their jobs to hold the integrity of the piece. Balanchine's use of musicality can also be seen in this work. His other famous works with New York City Ballet are popular today and are performed in the Lincoln Center by New York City Ballet: Mozartiana, Apollo, Orpheus, and A Midsummer Night's Dream.

Death
In his last years, Balanchine suffered from angina pectoris and underwent heart bypass surgery.

After years of illness, Balanchine died on April 30, 1983, aged 79, in Manhattan from Creutzfeldt–Jakob disease, which was diagnosed only after his death. He first showed symptoms during 1978 when he began losing his balance while dancing. As the disease progressed, his equilibrium, eyesight, and hearing deteriorated. By 1982, he was incapacitated. The night of his death, the company went on with its scheduled performance, which included Divertimento No. 15 and Symphony in C at Lincoln Center.

Clement Crisp, one of the many writers who eulogized Balanchine, assessed his contribution: "It is hard to think of the ballet world without the colossal presence of George Balanchine ..." In his lifetime he created 465 works. Balanchine extended the traditions of classical ballet. His choreography remains the same to the present day and the School of American Ballet still uses his teaching technique. As one of the 20th century's best-known choreographers, his style and vision of ballet is interesting to many generations of choreographers.

He had a Russian Orthodox funeral, and was interred at the Oakland Cemetery at Sag Harbor, Suffolk County, New York at the same cemetery where Alexandra Danilova was later interred.

Personal life 
In 1923, Balanchine married Tamara Geva, a sixteen-year-old dancer. After later parting ways with Geva, he became romantically involved with the ballerina Alexandra Danilova, from approximately 1924 to 1931. As The New York Times described their relationship in its obituary for Danilova: "She and Balanchine left the Soviet Union in 1924... Until 1931, she and Balanchine lived together as husband and wife, although they were never married. Balanchine was still officially married to another dancer, Tamara Geva, and he told Miss Danilova that because his marriage papers had been left behind in Russia, he feared it might be difficult to arrange a legal separation." He married and divorced three more times, all to women who were his dancers: Vera Zorina (1938–1946), Maria Tallchief (1946–1952), and Tanaquil LeClercq (1952–1969). He had no children by any of his marriages and no known offspring from any of his extramarital liaisons.

Biographer and intellectual historian Clive James has argued that Balanchine, despite his creative genius and brilliance as a ballet choreographer, had his darker side. In his Cultural Amnesia: Necessary Memories from History and the Arts (2007), James writes that:

Legacy and honors

With his School of American Ballet, New York City Ballet, and 400 choreographed works, Balanchine transformed American dance and created neoclassical ballet, developing a unique style with his dancers highlighted by brilliant speed and attack.

A monument at the Tbilisi Opera and Ballet Theatre in Georgia was dedicated in Balanchine's memory. A crater on Mercury was named in his honor.

George Balanchine Way is a segment of West 63rd Street (located between Columbus Avenue and Broadway) in New York City that was renamed in his honor in June 1990.

Awards 
 1975 French Légion d'honneur
 1978 Kennedy Center Honors
 1980 Austrian Decoration for Science and Art
 1983 Presidential Medal of Freedom
 1987 National Museum of Dance's Mr. & Mrs. Cornelius Vanderbilt Whitney Hall of Fame (posthumously)
 1988 Induction into the American Theater Hall of Fame
 Kisselgoff, Anna. "Balanchine 100: The Centennial Celebration"

Selected choreographed works

 1928 Apollo
 1929 The Prodigal Son
 1935 Serenade
 1936 Slaughter on Tenth Avenue
 1936 Zenobia
 1937 Jeu de cartes
 1941 Concerto Barocco
 1941 Tschaikovsky Piano Concerto No. 2
 1942 Circus Polka
 1946 La Sonnambula
 1946 The Four Temperaments
 1947 Symphonie Concertante
 1947 Symphony in C
 1947 Theme and Variations
 1948 Orpheus
 1949 Bourrée fantasque
 1949 The Firebird
 1951 La Valse
 1951 Swan Lake (Act 2)
 1952 Bayou
 1952 Scotch Symphony
 1954 Ivesiana
 1954 Western Symphony
 1956 Allegro Brillante
 1956 Divertimento No. 15
 1957 Agon
 1957 Square Dance
 1958 Gounod Symphony
 1958 Stars and Stripes
 1959 Episodes
 1960 Donizetti Variations
 1960 Liebeslieder Walzer
 1960 Monumentum pro Gesualdo
 1960 Ragtime (I)
 1960 Tschaikovsky Pas de Deux
 1961 Raymonda Variations
 1962 A Midsummer Night's Dream
 1963 Bugaku
 1964 Tarantella
 1965 Don Quixote
 1965 Harlequinade
 1966 Brahms–Schoenberg Quartet
 1966 Variations
 1967 Divertimento Brillante
 1967 Jewels
 Emeralds
 Rubies
 Diamonds
 1967 Ragtime (II)
 1968 Metastaseis and Pithoprakta
 1968 Requiem Canticles
 1968 La Source
 1968 Slaughter on Tenth Avenue
 1970 Tschaikovsky Suite No. 3
 1970 Who Cares?
 1972 Duo Concertant
 1972 Pulcinella
 1972 Scherzo à la Russe
 1972 Stravinsky Violin Concerto
 1972 Symphony in Three Movements
 1973 Cortège Hongrois
 1975 Le tombeau de Couperin
 1975 The Steadfast Tin Soldier
 1976 Chaconne
 1976 Union Jack
 1977 Vienna Waltzes
 1978 Ballo della Regina
 1978 Kammermusik No. 2
 1979 Le Bourgeois Gentilhomme
 1980 Robert Schumann's Davidsbündlertänze
 1980 Walpurgisnacht Ballet
 1981 Garland Dance
 1981 Mozartiana
 1982 Élégie
 1982 Noah and the Flood

Notable students
Over the decades Balanchine shared his artistic insights with several of his students including:
 Francisco Moncion
 Nicholas Magallanes

See also 
 Balanchine method
 Contemporary ballet
 List of dancers
 List of Russian ballet dancers
 List of Eastern Bloc defectors
 :Category: Ballets by George Balanchine

References

Sources

Further reading

External links 

 
 Biography on the website of the George Balanchine Foundation
  George Balanchine Catalog, including premiere date, cast, collaborators, and synopsis for all choreographic works
 Timeline of Balanchine's life on the website of the George Balanchine Trust
 A discussion about the Balanchine Technique with Balanchine dancer Suzanne Farrell at a July 08, 2006 PillowTalk at Jacob's Pillow Dance Festival
 Firebird performed by Maria Tallchief and Michael Maule, Jacob's Pillow, 1951
 Suzanne Farrell on Balanchine: More than Technique Jacob's Pillow, 2006
 Archival footage of Nora Kaye and Hugh Laing performing in Balanchine's The Gods Go a-Begging in 1951 at Jacob’s Pillow Dance Festival.
 George Balanchine: Master of the Dance American Masters, PBS, January 14, 2004
 
 Guide to George Balanchine archive at Houghton Library, Harvard University

Articles
 
 
 

1904 births
1983 deaths
American people of Georgian (country) descent
American people of Russian descent
American choreographers
Ballet choreographers
Male ballet dancers from Georgia (country)
Ballet masters
Ballet Russe de Monte Carlo choreographers
Ballet teachers
 
Ballets Russes choreographers
Choreographers of American Ballet Theatre
Choreographers of New York City Ballet
Deaths from Creutzfeldt–Jakob disease
Neurological disease deaths in New York (state)
Infectious disease deaths in New York (state)
Kennedy Center honorees
New York City Ballet
Dancers from Saint Petersburg
Presidential Medal of Freedom recipients
Recipients of the Austrian Decoration for Science and Art
Russian male ballet dancers
Russian choreographers
Soviet defectors
White Russian emigrants to France
White Russian emigrants to the United States
Emigrants from the Russian Empire to France
Vaganova graduates